Richard Peña (born 1953) is a Professor of Professional Practice at the Columbia University School of The Arts. He was  formerly program director of the Film Society of Lincoln Center (organizers of the New York Film Festival and the New Directors/New Films Festival).

Early life, family and education
Peña is the son of Spanish and Puerto Rican parents. He  was raised in New York City.

He earned his bachelor's degree at Harvard University and earned a Master's degree in film from the Massachusetts Institute of Technology.

Career
Peña taught at the University of California Berkeley before joining the Film Center at the Art Institute of Chicago as a film curator. In 1988, he joined the Film Society of Lincoln Center as the director of programming. At the Film Society, Richard Peña organized retrospectives of Michelangelo Antonioni, Sacha Guitry, acclaimed Iranian director Abbas Kiarostami, Robert Aldrich, Wojciech Has, Youssef Chahine, Yasujirō Ozu, and most recently Amitabh Bachchan, as well as major film series devoted to African, Taiwanese, Polish, Hungarian, Arab, Cuban and Argentine cinema.

In the wake of the September 11, 2001 attacks on the World Trade Center, Peña was involved in the controversy over Abbas Kiarostami, who was refused a US immigration visa to attend the festival because of his Iranian roots. Peña had personally invited Kiarostami to the festival but his visa application was rejected. In the event Peña stated: "It's a terrible sign of what's happening in my country today that no one seems to realize or care about the kind of negative signal this sends out to the entire Muslim world."

From 2001 to 2002, Peña was the host of Sundance Channel's Conversations in World Cinema, on which he interviewed Harmony Korine among other leading filmmakers. Since 1996, he has organized together with Unifrance Film the annual "Rendez-Vous with French Cinema Today" program. He is also responsible for creating the annual New York Jewish Film Festival.

Peña is a Professor of Professional Practice in the Film Department at Columbia University, where he specializes in film theory and international cinema and founded the Columbia University MA program in Film Studies: History, Theory and Criticism (HTC). He resigned from his posts as the Film Society of Lincoln Center's Program Director (after 25 years) and as the head of the NYFF Selection Committee and will be organizing a new educational initiative for the film society.

Honors
He was honored at the 2013 Jerusalem Film Festival and held a discussion with Mohsen Makhmalbaf after the screening of The Gardener about the power of cinema.

Personal life
He resides in his hometown, New York City, with his wife and three children.

References

People from New York City
Harvard University alumni
Massachusetts Institute of Technology alumni
Order of Arts and Letters of Spain recipients
Living people
1953 births